Khalkhalah is a Syrian village in Shahba District in As-Suwayda Governorate. According to the Syria Central Bureau of Statistics (CBS), Khalkhalah had a population of 2,268 in the 2004 census.

History
In 1838, it was noted as a ruin, situated "in the Luhf, east of the Lejah, i.e. in Wady el-Liwa".

References

Bibliography

Populated places in Shahba District
Villages in Syria